The Lermontov Cup is a tennis tournament held in Lermontov, Russia since 2012. The event is part of the ATP Challenger Tour and is played on clay courts.

Past finals

Singles

Doubles

References

External links

 
ATP Challenger Tour
Tennis tournaments in Russia
Clay court tennis tournaments